Gustavo Simoni (5 November 1845, in Rome – 10 May 1926, in Palestrina) was an Italian painter, watercolorist and art teacher. He is best known for his Orientalist scenes.

Biography 
He had a younger brother,  who, with his encouragement, also became a painter.

beginning in 1877, he travelled extensively, visiting France, Spain and, especially, North Africa, where he made several lengthy stays in Algeria, Tunisia and Morocco. For many years, he lived in an isolated house near Tlemcen, where he was visited by his friends and associates from Rome and developed a relationship with the local authorities. In 1889, he won a gold medal at the Salon for his monumental depiction of the burning of Persepolis. King Umberto I was among his regular clients. He was also a member of the Accademia di San Luca.

In the 1890s, he opened a studio in Paris and started a school for Orientalist painting in Rome. When he returned there, he lived in farmhouse that had been renovated by his son-in-law, the architect . He had five children altogether, three of whom became painters: Paolo (1882-1960), also an Orientalist, who died during the Algerian War, Mario (1885-1953), who specialized in still-lifes, and Ettore (1895-?), who emigrated to Arizona and painted desert landscapes.

In addition to his Orientalist scenes, he created genre scenes, plus highly imaginative historical scenes from ancient Rome and the 17th century. the 18th century. His works, however, are generally more familiar among watercolorists in England than in Italy.

Outside of Italy, his works may be seen in Glasgow, Leipzig, Melbourne and New York.

Sources 
 Gian Francesco Lomonaco. Acquerelli dell'Ottocento, La Società degli Acquarellisti a Roma, 1987
 Renato Mammucari, Acquerellisti romani: suggestioni neoclassiche, esotismo orientale, decadentismo bizantino, realismo borghese, Edimond, 2001

External links 

More works by Simoni @ ArtNet

1845 births
1926 deaths
Italian painters
Italian orientalists
Italian genre painters
Painters from Rome